Tai Koo may refer to:

Taikoo Shing, a private housing estate in Quarry Bay, Hong Kong
Taikoo Sugar Refinery
Taikoo Place, a group of office buildings in Quarry Bay, Hong Kong
Tai Koo station, a station on the Island line of the MTR, the underground railway system in Hong Kong
The Cantonese name of Swire Group.

See also
Taikoo Hui (disambiguation)
Taikoo Li (disambiguation)